Artur Kayumov (born 14 February 1998) is a Russian professional ice hockey forward for Lokomotiv Yaroslavl of the Kontinental Hockey League.

Playing career
He was picked by the Chicago Blackhawks 50th overall in the 2016 NHL Entry Draft.

During the 2018–19 season, while playing in his first full season with Lokomotiv, Kayumov was suspended by the KHL for 13 games for illegally delivering a check to the head of Jokerit's Jesper Jensen and then inadvertently punching a referee in the face.

International play

On 23 January 2022, Kayumov was named to the roster to represent Russian Olympic Committee athletes at the 2022 Winter Olympics.

Career statistics

Regular season and playoffs

International

References

External links
 

1998 births
Living people
Chicago Blackhawks draft picks
Lokomotiv Yaroslavl players
Russian ice hockey forwards
Ice hockey players at the 2022 Winter Olympics
Medalists at the 2022 Winter Olympics
Olympic silver medalists for the Russian Olympic Committee athletes
Olympic medalists in ice hockey
Olympic ice hockey players of Russia